The Southern Outfall Sewer is a major sewer taking sewage from the southern area of central London to Crossness in south-east London. Flows from three interceptory sewers combine at a pumping station in Deptford and then run under Greenwich, Woolwich, Plumstead and across Erith marshes. The Outfall Sewer was designed by Joseph Bazalgette after an outbreak of cholera in 1853 and "The Big Stink" of 1858. Work started on the sewer in 1860 and it was finally opened on 4 April 1865 by H.R.H. the Prince of Wales.

Until this time, central London's drains were built primarily to cope with rain water, and the growing use of flush toilets frequently meant these became overloaded, flushing mud, shingle, sewage and industrial effluent into the River Thames. Bazalgette's London sewerage system project included the construction of intercepting sewers north and south of the Thames; the Northern Outfall Sewer diverts flows away from the Thames north of the river.

South of the river, three major interceptor sewers were constructed:
The high-level sewer starts at Herne Hill, and heads eastward under Peckham and New Cross to a pumping station at Deptford.
The middle-level sewer starts on Balham Hill and runs under Clapham High Street, under Stockwell and Brixton, through Camberwell to Deptford.
The low-level sewer begins in Putney and runs through Battersea, Vauxhall, and under the Old Kent Road and Bermondsey to Deptford.

At Deptford pumping station the sewage is lifted by 18.9 ft (5.76 m) to the next section of the sewer which then runs east under Greenwich and Woolwich. From Plumstead to Crossness Pumping Station, the covered sewer forms the southern boundary of Thamesmead and has been landscaped as an elevated footpath called the Ridgeway (similar to The Greenway built over the Northern Outfall Sewer).

See also
 London sewer system
 Thames Tideway Tunnel

References

External links
Crossness Pumping Station

London water infrastructure
Subterranean London
Thames Water